Call Me Mr. Telephone (Answering Service) is a 1985 single by American teenage singer, Cheyne, which was produced by Mark Kamins and Stephane Gerbier, and written by Nicolosi Giuseppe and Tony Carrasco (credited as Answering Service).

Background
The single is a cover version of a 1984 single that was recorded by the Italian group Answering Service (first name of the band Novecento), whose name was included in the bracket as an acknowledgement to the group and to avoid confusion due to the single being released internationally. At the time of the recording, there were rumors that Madonna did the vocals in 1983, but like with another song, “Baby Love,” the rumors proved to be false. This was Cheyne's only charted single, which topped the Dance chart for 1 week on June 8, 1985, and remained on the chart for eleven weeks.  On the soul chart Call Me Mr. Telephone peaked at number sixty-two.

Charts

References

External links
Music Video from YouTube

1985 singles
Songs about telephone calls
Dance-pop songs
1984 songs
MCA Records singles
Song recordings produced by Mark Kamins